The hangnest tody-tyrant (Hemitriccus nidipendulus) is a species of bird in the family Tyrannidae.
It is endemic to Brazil. Its natural habitats are subtropical or tropical moist lowland forest and heavily degraded former forest.

References

Hemitriccus
Birds of the Atlantic Forest
Birds of Brazil
Endemic birds of Brazil
Birds described in 1831
Taxonomy articles created by Polbot